Kristian Anker (October 29, 1848 – November 16, 1928) was a Lutheran minister who served as the first president of the combined Trinity Seminary and Dana College.

Kristian Anker served as a Lutheran pastor in Elk Horn, Iowa, and Lincoln, Nebraska. Kristian Anker was pastor of St. Stephen's Evangelical Lutheran Church in Chicago from 1881-1882.

References

External links
Anker Society
Kristian Anker Portrait

Other sources
E. Mortensen, Stories from Our Church (Des Moines, Iowa: 1952)
P. C. Nyholm, The Americanization of the Danish Lutheran Churches (Copenhagen: 1963)
J. M. Jensen, The United Evangelical Lutheran Church: An Interpretation (Minneapolis, Mn: 1964)

Other reading
Foght, Harold Waldstein Rural Denmark and its Schools    (MacMillan New York: 1915)
Schwieder, Dorothy  Iowa: The Middle Land (University Of Iowa Press: 1996)
Vig, P. S.  Dansk Luthersk Mission i Amerika i Tiden för 1884 (Blair, Nebraska: 1917) Norwegian

Danish emigrants to the United States
1848 births
1928 deaths
20th-century American Lutheran clergy
People from Odense
19th-century American Lutheran clergy